Dimo is a Boma in the Central Equatoria in South Sudan, on the border with the Democratic Republic of the Congo.

Democratic Republic of the Congo–South Sudan border crossings
Populated places in Central Equatoria